Julien Courbey (born 12 March 1976) is a French actor.

Theater

Filmography

External links

 Photos of Julien Courbey.
 Julien Courbey on Allocine

Living people
1976 births
French male film actors
French male television actors
Male actors from Toulouse